The Polokwane Ring Road, also known as The Polokwane Eastern Ring Road is a halfway ring road that circles the city of Polokwane, South Africa. It is part of the N1 National Route.

Route
The ring road was opened in late 2020 and cost an estimated R800 million. The ring road is fully formed by the N1 freeway. It begins at the N1 and R101 split (south-west of the city centre), and runs North East around Polokwane. It then crosses the R37, then the R71 and finally the R81. The ring road then comes to an end at the N1 and R101 merge (north of the city centre). This forms the half ring road around Polokwane.

See also
Ring Roads in South Africa

References

Ring roads in South Africa
N1 (South Africa)